Evert Hoek FREng (born in 1933 in Southern Rhodesia, now Zimbabwe) is a Zimbabwean-Canadian Mechanical Engineer specialized Geotechnical Engineering and a leading international expert in rock mechanics.

Hoek began his research for Rock Mechanics in 1958 (due to problems with brittle rock in deep gold mines in South Africa) and in 1965 at the University of Cape Town PhD (rock fracture under static stress conditions). From 1965 he was at Imperial College, where he set up at the Royal School of Mines one faculty-wide center for rock mechanics. He developed there, among others In 1968, a triaxial test for Rock Mechanics. Later he became a professor at the University of Toronto in 1975 for twelve years as a senior consulting engineer at Golder Associates (where he was Senior Principal and Chairman) in Vancouver, then an independent consulting engineer with a private engineering firm in Vancouver.

Hoek was elected a member of the National Academy of Engineering in 2006 for major worldwide contributions in the development and application of rational design procedures for engineered systems in rock. He is also a Fellow of the Royal Academy of Engineering and the Canadian Academy of Engineering. He received a doctorate degree (D. Sc.) from the University of London and honorary doctorates in the University of Toronto and the University of Waterloo. He received the first prize of the Mueller International Society of Rock Mechanics and was the 1983 Rankine Lecturer ( Strength of jointed rock masses ) and 2000 Terzaghi Lecturer ( Big tunnels in bad rock ).
Dr. Hoek has published more than 100 papers and 3 books. His classic Rock Slope Engineering has been updated by Duncan Wyllie to a 5th edition, published by CRC Press in 2017.

See also 
 Hoek–Brown failure criterion

References

Links 
 Rock Science. Hoek's Corner

1933 births
Canadian civil engineers
Rhodesian emigrants to Canada
Living people
Geotechnical engineers
Rankine Lecturers